The 1958 Tour de Romandie was the 12th edition of the Tour de Romandie cycle race and was held from 8 May to 11 May 1958. The race started and finished in Porrentruy. The race was won by Gilbert Bauvin.

General classification

References

1958
Tour de Romandie